USA-240, also referred to as Orbital Test Vehicle 3 (OTV-3), is the second flight of the first Boeing X-37B, an American unmanned robotic vertical-takeoff, horizontal-landing spaceplane. It was launched to low Earth orbit aboard an Atlas V rocket from Cape Canaveral on 11 December 2012. Its mission designation is part of the USA series.

The spaceplane was operated by Air Force Space Command, which has not revealed the specific objectives of the mission or identity of the mission's payload. The Air Force stated only that the "mission will incorporate the lessons learned during the refurbishment process on OTV-1. As the X-37B program is examining the affordability and reusability of space vehicles, validation through testing is vital to the process. We are excited to see how this vehicle performs on a second flight."

Mission
OTV-3, the second mission for the first X-37B, and the third X-37B mission overall, was originally scheduled to be launched on 25 October 2012, but was postponed because of an engine issue with the Atlas V launch vehicle.  The X-37B was successfully launched from Cape Canaveral on 11 December 2012. In March 2014, OTV-3 broke the X-37B program's endurance record by passing 470 days in space.

The vehicle landed at Vandenberg AFB on 17 October 2014 at 16:24 UTC, having spent just short of 675 days in orbit.

See also

2012 in spaceflight
USA-212
USA-226

References

Satellites of the United States Air Force
USA satellites
Spacecraft launched in 2012
DARPA
Spacecraft which reentered in 2014
Boeing X-37